Nicholas Ferraro (May 30, 1928 – December 21, 1984) was an American lawyer and politician from New York.

Life
He was born on May 30, 1928, in Astoria, Queens, New York City. He attended Public School No. 85, Junior High School No. 141, and William Cullen Bryant High School. He graduated from Seton Hall College, and in 1953 from Brooklyn Law School. He practiced law in New York City, and entered politics as a Democrat. He married Virginia Kachadrian, and they had three children. They lived in Jackson Heights, Queens. In 1957, he was appointed as an assistant district attorney of Queens County.

He was a member of the New York State Senate from 1966 to 1973, sitting in the 176th, 177th, 178th, 179th and 180th New York State Legislatures. In November 1973, he was elected D.A. of Queens County.

He was D.A. of Queens County from 1974 to 1976. Upon taking office, he appointed his cousin Geraldine Ferraro (1935–2011) as an Assistant D.A. In November 1976, he was elected to the New York Supreme Court.

He was a Justice of the Supreme Court from 1977 to April 1984 when he resigned from the bench, and resumed his private practice.

He died on December 21, 1984, in the City Hospital Center in Elmhurst, Queens, after a heart attack.

Sources

1928 births
1984 deaths
People from Queens, New York
Democratic Party New York (state) state senators
Brooklyn Law School alumni
Seton Hall University alumni
Queens County (New York) District Attorneys
20th-century American politicians
20th-century American lawyers
American people of Italian descent